Victoria Mary Carter  is a former New Zealand politician. She is now a professional company director and businesswoman.

Early life
Carter, born in England, came to New Zealand with her mother, journalist Valerie Davies. Her stepfather was journalist, Pat Booth.

Education and early career
Carter holds a law degree from the University of Auckland and has a varied background in public relations, marketing, and governance. Carter has served on the boards of Kidicorp, Turner’s Auctions, New Zealand Thoroughbred Racing, Auckland Racing Club, and JUCY group. She was extensively involved with the Auckland Kindergarten Association from 1995 to 2005, as Chair (4 years), Deputy-Chair (3 years), and Councillor (3 years), ending up as the President of the Association.

Political career 

Carter was elected as an Auckland City Councillor in 1998 for the Hobson ward. Carter was the first independent trustee to be elected to the Auckland Energy Consumer Trust in 1997, but had to resign from this position when elected to Auckland City Council.

She served as Chair of City Attractions at Auckland City Council and led the public private partnership that saw the indoor arena at Quay Street built. Carter also restarted the Auckland Arts Festival which she chaired until June 2015.

Later career
Carter left politics in 2003 to pursue business opportunities, co-founding Cityhop, New Zealand’s first car sharing company with JUCY Group led by brothers Tim and Dan Alpe. JUCY later exited Cityhop.

In May 2018 Victoria was elected as the first female President of the Northern Club.

In November 2018 she sold the carshare business to Toyota Financial Services.
She still speaks about the value of car share to cities battling congestion

In September 2019 Minister of Transport Phil Twyford appointed Victoria to the Board of Waka Kotahi, NZ Transport Agency. Carter is also an Independent director of Ngati Awa Group Holdings, the commercial arm of the Ngati Awa runanga in the Bay of Plenty.

Honours and awards 
In 2013 Carter was named in the inaugural Forty Over 40 list acknowledging women who are disrupting and reinventing, and was the only Australasian selected.  She was a finalist in the arts category of the Women of Influence awards in 2013 and 2014.

In the 2016 New Year Honours, Carter was appointed an Officer of the New Zealand Order of Merit for service to arts, business, and the community.

References 

University of Auckland alumni
Auckland City Councillors
New Zealand businesspeople
New Zealand women in business
Year of birth missing (living people)
Living people
Officers of the New Zealand Order of Merit
English emigrants to New Zealand